Steve Kluger (born June 24, 1952) is an American author, playwright, journalist, librettist and lyricist, whose writing is noted for its baseball, gay, and historical (particularly World War II) themes.  He has also worked on civil rights, gay rights, and baseball community causes, including Japanese American internment redress and the campaign to save Fenway Park.

His second novel, Last Days of Summer, is the basis for the 2018 musical of the same title.

Steve Kluger lives in Brookline, Massachusetts.

Early life and education 
Kluger was born and raised in Baltimore, Maryland.  He graduated from Hackley School in Tarrytown, New York, in 1970, and attended the University of Southern California.

Published and produced works

Novels 
 Changing Pitches (1984)
 Last Days of Summer (1998)
 Almost Like Being in Love (2004)
 My Most Excellent Year (2008)

Non-fiction 
Yank: World War II from the Guys Who Brought You Victory (1990)

Plays 
 Bullpen (1984)
 Cafe 50's (1988)
 Pilots of the Purple Twilight (1989)
 After Dark (2001)
 Last Days of Summer (musical, 2018) (book and lyrics)

Newspaper articles 
For USA Today, Kluger has contributed the following commentaries:
"Washington's Senators: Baseball As It Should Be," October 11, 2004
"The Curse of the Black Sox," October 26, 2005
"The Best Things in Life are Free—For Now," February 15, 2006
"Give Me Your Tired, Your Poor—or Not," August 2, 2006
"Foley Fade-Out," October 11, 2006
"Field of Dreams," April 26, 2007
"The Aging of Aquarius," August 13, 2009
"Thank You, Mr. President, From Us Kids," November 22, 2013

Other newspaper and magazine pieces include:
"You Gotta Have Heartburn," Sports Illustrated, May 16, 1983
"'Play Ball!' — Words to Remember Manzanar," Los Angeles Times, August 7, 2002
"Blame it All on the Gay Agenda," The Boston Globe, November 2, 2006

Awards and honors 
Last Days of Summer won the American Library Association's Alex Award in 1999; Almost Like Being in Love won the 2004 Lambda Literary Award for Romance; and My Most Excellent Year received the 2009 Amelia Elizabeth Walden Award for outstanding achievement in Young Adult fiction.

References

External links

 

1952 births
20th-century American novelists
21st-century American novelists
20th-century American dramatists and playwrights
American male novelists
Living people
Date of birth missing (living people)
People from Baltimore
American male dramatists and playwrights
20th-century American male writers
21st-century American male writers
Lambda Literary Award winners
American LGBT novelists
American LGBT dramatists and playwrights
American gay writers